Najiba Faiz (Pashto: نجیبه فېض) born 1 August 1988, is an Afghan-born Pakistani television host, television and film actress, known for playing variety of notable characters in films and in television mostly in Pakistan and Afghanistan. She began her career as a child artist, and later started in television serials such as Sang-e-Mar Mar and its second trilogy Sang-e-Mah. Faiz is currently hosting a morning show on Hum Pashto 1.

Early life and career 
Her father is an Afghan immigrant who migrated to Pakistan in the 1980s. She grew up mostly in Peshawar and later moved on to Karachi and Islamabad. Faiz started her career with working on a children program "Story", which aired on PTV. In 2002, she started her acting career with "Rogh Lewani", a Pashto serial, where she played a secretary of Asmail Shahid (Maanay). The role helped her rise to stardom and served as a launching pad for her career. 

After the launch of the maiden Pashto channel, AVT, in 2004, Najiba Faiz returned to the industry. She hosted programs and acted in various drama serials. Since then, she has acted in several plays including Sang-e-Mar Mar, which aired on Hum TV. She worked in other two dramas, Mohabbat Khawab Safar and Sangsar which also aired on Hum TV. Her role as a grief stricken mother in Saawan that fights all odds to reunite with her son was highly praised by critics. Najeeba had a viral moment in the Pakistan Super League match match between Quetta Gladiators and Peshawar Zalmi, where photos and videos of her crying at tense moments of the match were widely shared and talked about on social media.

Najeeba Faiz also worked in Afghanistan for three years. There, apart from acting and hosting many different shows, she was also the host for the Afghan version of Who wants to be a Millionaire.

Filmography

Television

References

External links 
 

Pakistani film actresses
Pakistani television actresses
Living people
Afghan emigrants to Pakistan
20th-century Pakistani actresses
21st-century Pakistani actresses
Pakistani people of Afghan descent
Pashtun women
1963 births